Tobias Sippel (born 22 March 1988) is a German professional footballer who plays as a goalkeeper for Bundesliga club Borussia Mönchengladbach.

Career

Early career
Born in Bad Dürkheim, Sippel began his football career playing for his hometown club SV 1911 Bad Dürkheim. He rose through the youth ranks culminating as the first goalkeeper for their 2005 entry in the Regionalliga Süd (tier four of the German football league system) at the age of 17.

Kaiserslautern
In 2006, then-Bundesliga club 1. FC Kaiserslautern signed him to his first professional contract.  

Sippel spent one season playing with Kaiserslautern II in the Oberliga Südwest (then tier four of the German football league system). After one year, he joined the first team as the third keeper behind Jürgen Macho and Florian Fromlowitz. The previous season had seen Kaiserslautern relegated from the Bundesliga to the 2. Bundesliga. He ascended to the second keeper behind U-21 national keeper Fromlowitz when Macho left Kaiserslautern to play for the Greek club AEK Athens.  

Ten games into the 2007–08 season, Fromlowitz was injured thrusting Sippel into the role of starting goalkeeper. He helped Kaiserslautern avoid relegation to the 3. Liga on the last day of the season with a clean sheet versus already promoted 1. FC Köln.

The 2008–09 campaign started with a bang for Sippel as Kaiserslautern shot to the top of the league table anchored by their number one goalkeeper, however nine games into the season, Sippel broke his arm on a freak play during a 2–1 win versus Rot-Weiß Oberhausen. He was placed on injured reserve until the beginning of 2009.

Borussia Mönchengladbach

On 26 May 2015, Sippel joined Borussia Mönchengladbach on free transfer, signing a three-year deal.

International
Sippel was called up to the senior Germany squad by Joachim Löw in the build up to the 2010 FIFA World Cup.

Career statistics

Club

Honours

Club
1. FC Kaiserslautern
 2. Bundesliga: 2009–10

International
Germany
 UEFA Under-21 Championship: 2009

References

External links
 

1988 births
Living people
People from Bad Dürkheim
Footballers from Rhineland-Palatinate
German footballers
Association football goalkeepers
1. FC Kaiserslautern players
1. FC Kaiserslautern II players
Borussia Mönchengladbach players
Bundesliga players
2. Bundesliga players
Germany under-21 international footballers
Germany youth international footballers